The 2019 Simona Halep tennis season officially began on 8 January 2019 at the Sydney International. Simona Halep entered the season as the No. 1 ranked player in the world.

Year in detail

Early hard court season and Australian Open

Sydney International
Halep started season playing at Sydney International as the top seed. She lost to No. 15 in the world at the time Ashleigh Barty in two straight sets, extending her losing streak at five.

Australian Open
Halep's next tournament was Australian Open. In the first round she beat Kaia Kanepi in three sets.
. This match marked her first win since 2018 Western & Southern Open. In the second round, she faced Sofia Kenin, also winning in three sets. In the next rounds, she would play the Williams sisters. She won against Venus Williams in straight sets, but then, she lost to Serena Williams in three tight sets. In the end of the tournament, Naomi Osaka replaced her at rankings and peaked at No. 3, after Petra Kvitova.

Fed Cup World Group Quarterfinal
After win in World Group Play-offs vs Switzerland last year, team Romania came back on World Group, since 2016. In quarterfinals, they met team Czech Republic, in Ostrava. She led 2–0 in singles rubbers, defeating Katerina Siniakova and Karolina Pliskova. With these wins and the doubles rubber win by Monica Niculescu and Irina-Camelia Begu, they qualified for the first time, since 1973, in the semifinals of Fed Cup.

Qatar Ladies Open
Next tournament for Halep was Qatar Ladies Open, where she was the top seed and she had first round bye. En-route to the final, she defeated Lesia Tsurenko, Julia Gorges, and Elina Svitolina, where she trailed in the third set and, then, won five games in a row. In the final, she faced Elise Mertens. She lost in three sets, giving Mertens her first Premier title. This was the first final of the season for Halep.

Dubai Tennis Championships
Next tournament was Dubai Tennis Championships. She was no.3 seed and defeated Eugenie Bouchard and Lesia Tsurenko, both in two straight sets. In quarterfinal she was defeated by eventual champion, Belinda Bencic. In a conclusion of this tournament, Halep remains at no.2, after Kvitova lost in the final.

March sunshine events

Indian Wells Open
In the Indian Wells, Halep was seeded no.2. She defeated Barbora Strycova and Kateryna Kozlova in two straight sets. Halep lost in the fourth round against Markéta Vondroušová in three sets. After this tournament, she remains no.2 in the world.

Miami Open
After the run of Indian Wells, her next tournament was Miami Open. In the second round, she crushed Taylor Townsend in straight sets. In the third round, she defeated Polona Hercog in three tough sets. Halep won against Venus Williams and Qiang Wang, in fourth round and quarterfinal, respectively. She was in contention of regaining the no.1 spot by reaching the finals, after Osaka's defeat in the third round. In the semifinal, she faced Karolina Pliskova, losing in straight sets. After this tournament, she remained no.2.

European clay court season

Fed Cup World Group Semifinal
Her first clay-court event of the season was Fed Cup Semifinal. There, Romanian Fed Cup Team faced France in Rouen. In the singles rubber, Halep defeated Kristina Mladenovic and Caroline Garcia. At the doubles rubber, she played instead of Irina-Camelia Begu, withdrawing due to ankle injury, with Monica Niculescu. Anyway, after taking the first set, they lost, giving to France a ticket to the Fed Cup final.

Madrid Open

Italian Open

French Open

English grass court season

Eastbourne International

Wimbledon

Halep won the 2019 Wimbledon Championships defeating Serena Williams 6-2, 6-2.

All matches

Singles matches

Tournament results and points comparison 2018 -2019

Halep's 2019 singles tournament results and points is as follows:

Finals
Singles: 3 (1 title, 2 runner-ups)

Notes

References

External links

 
 
 
 

2019 in Romanian tennis
Halep tennis season
Simona Halep tennis seasons